Keter Torah (also spelled Keser Torah or Kesser Torah) (lit., "Crown of Torah") may refer to:

Keser Torah Radomsk – a yeshiva network founded by the fourth Radomsker Rebbe
Kesser Torah College – a Jewish day school in Sydney, Australia
Yeshiva Kesser Torah – a yeshiva and synagogue in Queens, New York
Keter Torah – a commentary on the Torah by Aaron ben Elijah
Keter Torah – a poem by Isaachar Bär ben Judah Carmoly